Setyaldi Putra Wibowo (born 29 December 1994) is an Indonesian male badminton player. Wibowo trained at the Guna Dharma Bandung badminton club, and in 2013, he chose to join the Indonesia national badminton team. In 2014, he won the USM International Series tournament in the men's singles event.

Achievements

BWF International Challenge/Series
Men's Singles

 BWF International Challenge tournament
 BWF International Series tournament
 BWF Future Series tournament

References

External links 
 

Living people
1994 births
People from Semarang
Sportspeople from Central Java
Indonesian male badminton players
21st-century Indonesian people